Ouroubé Douddé is a commune in the Cercle of Mopti in the Mopti Region of Mali. The commune contains nine villages and in 2009 had a population of 12,211.  The main village is Sendégué.

References

Communes of Mopti Region